Kadıköy is a village in the Yüksekova District of Hakkâri Province in Turkey. The village is populated by Kurds of the Pinyanişî tribe and had a population of 1,144 in 2022.

The two hamlets of Kalemli and Mamak are attached to Kadıköy.

History 
The village was populated by 30 Assyrian families in 1850 and 6 families in 1877.

Population 
Population history from 2000 to 2022:

References 

Villages in Yüksekova District
Kurdish settlements in Hakkâri Province
Historic Assyrian communities in Turkey